The San Diego Automotive Museum in Balboa Park in San Diego, California is a museum containing a collection of cars and motorcycles illustrating the history of the American automotive culture. The San Diego Automotive Museum is a non-profit corporation under IRS section 501(c) It is housed in the former California State Building, which was constructed for the 1935-36 California Pacific International Exposition.

One of the signature cars in the collection is Louie Mattar's Fabulous Car, a 1947 Cadillac-with-trailer that was driven non-stop from Alaska to Mexico City and across the United States. Its owner extensively modified it to become largely self-contained, and its cross-country trips incorporated in-motion refueling from support vehicles.
Exhibits are rotated every four months to bring in cars of different types or eras.

Gallery

References

External links

 
 San Diego Automotive Museum Website

Automobile museums in California
Museums in San Diego
Balboa Park (San Diego)
World's fair architecture in California
1988 establishments in California
Museums established in 1988